The castillo de Santa Ana, also known as Castillo de Las Roquetas, is a fortification built between the 16th and 17th centuries, located in the town of Roquetas de Mar (Almería) which was used for refugee to the inhabitants who lived near the port. It has an oblong shape. Near the castle there is a lighthouse.

The 1804 earthquake destroyed most of the structure, leaving only one of the towers and the raised level area, which has been conserved and recovered.

Nowadays, the castle offers photography and art exhibitions, concerts, speeches and natters. On 23 January 2014, the Ayuntamiento de Almería offered a tribute to the poet Julio Alfredo Egea, with the participation of writers like Pilar Quirosa, and texts about the politicians José Antonio Santano and Miguel Ángel Blanco.

References

Bibliography 

 

Bien de Interés Cultural landmarks in the Province of Almería
Castles in Andalusia